Diamantino Manuel Fernandes Miranda (born 3 August 1959), known simply as Diamantino in his playing days, is a Portuguese professional football manager and former player who played as a midfielder. He is the current manager of Mozambican club Liga Desportiva de Maputo.

Diamantino most notably played for Benfica (11 seasons in two separate spells), appearing in more than 300 official matches and winning 11 major titles. After retiring, he embarked in a lengthy managerial career.

An international during 1981–86, Diamantino represented Portugal at the 1986 World Cup and Euro 1984.

Club career
Born in Moita, Setúbal District, Diamantino was one of S.L. Benfica's key players during the 1980s, winning several Primeira Liga and Taça de Portugal titles. He also played in the UEFA Cup final in 1983, lost to R.S.C. Anderlecht (0–1 and 1–1), missing the European Cup final in 1988 due to an injury, in another defeat, this time to PSV Eindhoven on penalties.

Diamantino left Benfica at the end of the 1989–90 season, after appearing in just 15 league matches as the team won the Portuguese Supercup. He was also an unused substitute in their second European Cup loss in three years, against A.C. Milan, moving in the subsequent off-season to first professional club Vitória F.C. where he played three more years, retiring at almost 34.

International career
At youth level, Diamantino represented Portugal in two competitions: the 1978 UEFA European Under-18 Championship, in Poland, and the 1979 FIFA World Youth Championship, in Japan, playing three games in each tournament. Diamantino earned 22 caps with five goals for the Portugal national team, his debut coming on 18 November 1981 in a 2–1 win against Scotland for the 1982 FIFA World Cup qualifiers. He represented the nation at both UEFA Euro 1984 and the 1986 World Cup; in the latter tournament, on 11 July, in a 1–3 group stage loss to Morocco, he played his last match and scored his last goal.

Coaching career
A manager since 1994, starting at Setúbal, Diamantino managed that club for a handful of games in two top-flight spells, nearly a decade apart. Additionally at that level, he had two stints in charge of S.C. Campomaiorense.

Diamantino was appointed second division side S.C. Olhanense's manager midway through 2007–08, after having started the campaign at fellow league team Varzim SC. In May 2008 he joined Benfica as an assistant coach, under new boss Quique Sánchez Flores; both left the post at the end of the season, after which he moved to the youth academy.

In the summer of 2010, Diamantino signed for C.D. Fátima of the second level, being fired in late November. He moved abroad for the first time in his career to manage CD Costa do Sol in Mozambique, but his spell at the club ended in October 2013 when Minister of Labour Maria Helena Taipo expelled him from the southern African country for having called its people "thieves" in protest at a refereeing decision; he returned to the Moçambola in January 2019, when he was hired at Liga Desportiva de Maputo.

Citations
"Se cada corrupto andasse com uma lâmpada no cu, Portugal parecia Las Vegas" - 04/03/2023

Honours

Player
Benfica
Primeira Divisão: 1982–83, 1983–84, 1986–87, 1988–89
Taça de Portugal: 1979–80, 1982–83, 1984–85, 1985–86, 1986–87
Supertaça Cândido de Oliveira: 1985, 1989
European Cup runner-up: 1987–88, 1989–90
UEFA Cup runner-up: 1982–83

Manager
Campomaiorense
Segunda Liga: 1996–97

References

External links
 
 
 
 
 
 

1959 births
Living people
People from Moita
Portuguese footballers
Association football midfielders
Primeira Liga players
Liga Portugal 2 players
Vitória F.C. players
S.L. Benfica footballers
Amora F.C. players
Boavista F.C. players
Portugal youth international footballers
Portugal under-21 international footballers
Portugal international footballers
UEFA Euro 1984 players
1986 FIFA World Cup players
Portuguese football managers
Primeira Liga managers
Liga Portugal 2 managers
Vitória F.C. managers
C.D. Beja managers
S.C. Campomaiorense managers
Gil Vicente F.C. managers
Portimonense S.C. managers
Varzim S.C. managers
S.C. Olhanense managers
C.D. Fátima managers
Portuguese expatriate football managers
Expatriate football managers in Mozambique
Portuguese expatriate sportspeople in Mozambique
Sportspeople from Setúbal District